Stephen Fitzgerald may refer to:

Stephen FitzGerald (diplomat) (born 1938), Australian diplomat
Stephen Fitzgerald (rugby union) (born 1995), Irish rugby union player

See also
Stephen R. Fitzgarrald (1854–1926), American politician